Donald Alistair Love (born 2 December 1994) is a professional footballer who plays as a defender for  club Morecambe. He began his professional career with Manchester United, but made just two senior appearances, and after a loan spell with Wigan Athletic in 2015, he was sold to Sunderland at the end of the 2015–16 season. Three years into a four-year contract, he was released by the club and joined Shrewsbury Town.

Born in England, Love represents Scotland at international level, having played for the under-17, under-19 and under-21 national teams.

Club career

Manchester United and Wigan Athletic (loan)
Love was born in Rochdale, Greater Manchester. He played junior football for Northwich Town and was personally scouted by Sir Alex Ferguson. After rising through the ranks of the Manchester United academy, he first signed a professional contract with Manchester United in 2013.

On 2 October 2015, he was loaned to Wigan Athletic for two months. Love made his professional debut the following day, appearing as a 70th-minute substitute for Will Grigg in a goalless League One draw with Walsall at the DW Stadium. Love totalled eight appearances for the Latics.

After returning from his loan spell, Love made his Manchester United debut in a 2–1 defeat against Sunderland at the Stadium of Light on 13 February 2016, coming on as a first-half substitute for the injured Matteo Darmian. Five days later, he made his first start in an injury-stricken United team, a 2–1 loss away to Midtjylland in the first leg of the Europa League round of 32, and was booked for a challenge on Martin Pušić that caused the Austrian to be substituted.

Sunderland
On 11 August 2016, Love joined Premier League club Sunderland on a four-year deal. He joined with his Manchester United teammate Paddy McNair, for a combined fee of £5.5 million. He made his debut two days later, playing the full 90 minutes of a 2–1 loss at Manchester City, and scored his first goal for Sunderland in an EFL Cup tie against Carlisle United on 22 August 2017.

In August 2018, Love sustained an injury to his ankle which, after attempting to continue playing for another three matches, kept him out of first-team action for the remainder of the 2018–19 season. After three years, a year before the end of his contract, Love was released by Sunderland in July 2019.

Shrewsbury Town
Following his release from Sunderland, on 12 July 2019, Love signed for fellow League One side Shrewsbury Town on a two-year deal. He made his debut on 3 August, playing the full 90 minutes of a 1–0 home win over Portsmouth. On 13 November, after coming on in the 67th minute for Louis Thompson in a 3–1 win over Macclesfield Town in the EFL Trophy group stage, he was sent off.

On 26 January 2020, in the fourth round of the FA Cup at home to Liverpool, Love drove Neco Williams' cross into his own net in the first minute of the second half to give Liverpool a 2–0 lead, though Shrewsbury drew the match 2–2 to earn a replay. On 12 May 2021 it was announced that he would leave Shrewsbury at the end of the season, following the expiry of his contract.

Salford City
On 31 August 2021, he signed a one-year contract with League Two side Salford City, with manager Gary Bowyer signing him to provide competition in various positions.

Morecambe
On 17 June 2022, Love agreed to join League One club Morecambe on a two-year deal upon the expiration of his contract with Salford City.

International career
Love was born in Rochdale, England but qualifies for the Scotland national team through his Stranraer-born grandmother. He has represented Scotland at under-17, under-19 and under-21 level.

Career statistics

References

External links

1994 births
Living people
Footballers from Rochdale
English footballers
Scottish footballers
English people of Scottish descent
Association football fullbacks
Manchester United F.C. players
Wigan Athletic F.C. players
Sunderland A.F.C. players
Shrewsbury Town F.C. players
Salford City F.C. players
Morecambe F.C. players
English Football League players
Premier League players
Scotland under-21 international footballers
Scotland youth international footballers